Mostafa Essam Mostafa Abouelela (born 20 May 2003) is a Qatari footballer who plays as a midfielder for Júpiter Leonés.

Career

Essam started his career with Qatari top flight side Al Rayyan, where he made 8 appearances and scored 0 goals. On 17 October 2021, Essam debuted for Al Rayyan during a 0–3 loss to Al Duhail. In 2022, he signed for Júpiter Leonés in the Spanish fifth tier.

References

External links
 

2003 births
Al-Rayyan SC players
Association football midfielders
Expatriate footballers in Spain
Living people
Qatar Stars League players
Qatari expatriate footballers
Qatari expatriate sportspeople in Spain
Qatari footballers
Tercera Federación players
Qatar youth international footballers